Dr David Chung Wai-keung JP is the currently the Under Secretary for Innovation and Technology of the Hong Kong Special Administrative Region since 1 March 2016.

Prior to appointed to the position, Dr Chung worked as Chief Technology Officer (2011 - 2016) and Head of IT Office (2008 - 2010) at Hong Kong Cyberport Management Company Limited. He was also a winner of the “China Top 5 CIO Award” in 2013.

Dr Chung holds a Bachelor of Science (Engineering) in Computer Science from Imperial College London, a Postgraduate Diploma in Business Management from the Chinese University of Hong Kong, a Master of Business Administration from the Open University of Hong Kong and a Doctorate in Engineering Management from City University of Hong Kong.

On 5 January 2022, Carrie Lam announced new warnings and restrictions against social gathering due to potential COVID-19 outbreaks. One day later, it was discovered that Chung attended a birthday party hosted by Witman Hung Wai-man, with 222 guests. At least one guest tested positive with COVID-19, causing all guests to be quarantined.

References

Hong Kong politicians
1966 births
Living people
Chief technology officers
Alumni of Imperial College London
Alumni of the Chinese University of Hong Kong
Alumni of Hong Kong Metropolitan University
Alumni of the City University of Hong Kong